Wansbeck is a constituency represented in the House of Commons of the UK Parliament since 2010 by Ian Lavery, a member of the Labour Party.

History 
Wansbeck was first created by the Redistribution of Seats Act 1885 as one of four single-member Divisions of the county of Northumberland. It was abolished in for the 1950 general election, when it was largely replaced by the new constituency of Blyth.

The seat was re-established for the 1983 general election, largely replacing the abolished Morpeth constituency. The new version of the seat had very little in common with the version abolished in 1950; only Newbiggin-by-the-Sea and some rural areas were in both.

Boundaries

1885-1918 
The Sessional Districts of:

 Bedlingtonshire
 Castle East (except the parish of Wallsend)
 Morpeth
 Castle West (part)
 Coquetdale East (part)

NB included non-resident freeholders in the parliamentary borough of Morpeth

1918–1950 

 The Urban Districts of Cramlington, Earsdon, Newbiggin-by-the-Sea, Newburn, Seaton Delaval, Seghill, and Whitley and Monkseaton
 parts of the Rural Districts of Castle Ward, and Morpeth.

Gained Newburn and surrounding areas from the abolished Tyneside Division. Ashington transferred to Morpeth and a small area in north (Amble) transferred to Berwick-upon-Tweed.

Abolition 
The contents of the constituency were distributed as follows:

 rural areas around the borough of Morpeth, including Newbiggin-by-the-Sea, to Morpeth;
 Seaton Valley urban district (incorporating Cramlington, Seghill, Earsdon and Seaton Delaval) to Blyth;
 Whitley Bay to Tynemouth;
 rural areas to the west of Newcastle upon Tyne to Hexham; and
 Newburn to Newcastle upon Tyne West

1983-present 

 the Borough of Castle Morpeth wards of Hebron, Hepscott and Mitford, Morpeth Central, Morpeth Kirkhill, Morpeth North, Morpeth South, Morpeth Stobhill and Pegswood; and
 the District of Wansbeck (comprising the wards of: Bedlington Central, Bedlington East, Bedlington West, Bothal, Central, Choppington, Guide Post, Haydon, Hurst, Newbiggin East, Newbiggin West, Park, Seaton, Sleekburn and Stakeford).

The majority of the constituency, including Morpeth, Ashington and Newbiggin had comprised the bulk of the abolished constituency of Morpeth. Bedlington was transferred from Blyth.

2007 boundary review 
In the fifth periodic boundary review of parliamentary representation in Northumberland, which came into effect for the 2010 general election, the Boundary Commission for England recommended that no changes be made to the Wansbeck constituency.

In 2009, a government reorganisation resulted in the abolition of all local government boroughs and districts in Northumberland and the establishment of the county as a unitary authority. However, this has not affected the current constituency boundaries.

Constituency profile
Named after the River Wansbeck and former district of the same name, the seat has the visitor attractions of a historic main town with a castle, Morpeth and the traditional seaside town of Newbiggin.  Workless claimants as registered jobseekers, with high male unemployment, which is widespread but exacerbated in the area, in November 2012, was higher than the national average of 3.8%, at 6.2% of the population based on a statistical compilation by The Guardian.  This was marginally higher than the then regional average of 5.9%.

Political history

1885–1950
Political history
The seat alternated in accordance with the national trend in strong mining communities outside of South Yorkshire, which as such saw significant early Labour support, and, in the 1931 and 1935 elections, led to a general transfer of loyalty to the Conservative Party, ushering in a return to Labour support at the next contested election in 1945.

Prominent frontbenchers
Alfred Robens represented the area in the Attlee ministry and towards the end of the year of Attlee's more marginal victory (1950–51) served as Minister of Labour and National Service.  He then in 1951 won instead the newly created Blyth seat to the immediate south.  In 1955 he became Shadow Foreign Secretary until an unimpressive performance in predicting and reacting to events in the Suez Crisis in 1956.  However, in a position which would span the period 1961 until 1971, he became Chairman of the National Coal Board (and Lord Robens) and oversaw substantial cuts in the mining industry.  During this period he co-authored the Robens Report that followed his difficult but practical risk management of the coal mining sector, including accepting some culpability in the Aberfan Disaster.  This led, with the ministry of Barbara Castle's adjustments, to the Health and Safety at Work Act 1974 which set up the Health and Safety Executive and remains the foundation of this area of English law.

1983-date
The constituency has been held solely by Labour since its recreation, during which time its history presents a safe seat.  However, in 2019 - in line with the huge swing in their favour in traditional Labour seats in the North and Midlands - the Conservatives reduced the Labour majority to an unprecedentedly low three-figure total.

Members of Parliament

MPs 1885–1950

MPs since 1983

Elections

Elections in the 2010s

Elections in the 2000s

Elections in the 1990s

Elections in the 1980s

Elections in the 1940s

Elections in the 1930s

Elections in the 1920s

Election results 1885–1918

Elections in the 1880s

Elections in the 1890s

Elections in the 1900s

Elections in the 1910s 

General Election 1914–15:

Another General Election was required to take place before the end of 1915. The political parties had been making preparations for an election to take place and by July 1914, the following candidates had been selected; 
Liberal-Labour:Charles Fenwick
Labour: William Straker

See also 
List of parliamentary constituencies in Northumberland
History of parliamentary constituencies and boundaries in Northumberland
1929 Wansbeck by-election
1940 Wansbeck by-election
1918 Wansbeck by-election

Notes

References

Sources
 

Parliamentary constituencies in Northumberland
Constituencies of the Parliament of the United Kingdom established in 1885
Constituencies of the Parliament of the United Kingdom disestablished in 1950
Constituencies of the Parliament of the United Kingdom established in 1983